Maytag Dairy Farms, based in Newton, Iowa USA, is a manufacturer of blue cheese and other food products.

History 
Maytag Dairy Farms was established in 1941 by Frederick Louis Maytag II. The history of the business dates back to 1919, when Frederick Louis Maytag II's father, Elmer Henry Maytag, purchased a single cow to provide milk for his family. He soon began to develop a small herd of Holstein-Friesian cows that would supply milk to his community, winning a vast number of blue ribbons at livestock shows across the United States. The offspring from his herd began to attract buyers from around the world.

Upon Elmer Henry Maytag’s death in 1940, his sons Fred and Robert Maytag assumed leadership of the farms. It was Fred Maytag-President & CEO of the Maytag Appliance Company who pursued his idea of creating a uniquely American blue cheese made from cow's milk. Fred collaborated with Iowa State University dairy researchers to pioneer the first great American blue cheese that would compete with classic European cheeses such as Roquefort made from sheep's milk. The cheese plant and caves were completed a year later and the first wheels of Maytag Blue Cheese were formed in October 1941. The milk from Maytag's Iowa Holsteins resulted in a rich, creamy cheese that resembled the flavors of European bleu cheeses. Ever a visionary, Fred sold his cheese in a unique new way—by catalog—essentially creating the practice of mail-ordering food that thrives today.

Fred's son Fritz Maytag assumed leadership in 1962 and led the small company for the next 50 years. Fritz now serves as chairman Emeritus and a director, along with his brother Ken Maytag and sister Martha Maytag.

Present day 
The cheese is made by hand in the small cheese plant that was constructed 80 years ago in the shadow of E.H.’s milking barn. The prize-winning herd is gone, but the barn remains and the company uses fresh milk from neighbor dairy farmers. The hand-formed wheels are aged for approximately six months. 

Maytag Dairy Farms was family owned until 2019 when it was acquired by Midwest Growth Partners, a private equity fund manager. In July 2022, AgCertain Industries purchased Maytag Dairy farms from Midwest Growth Partners.

See also
 List of dairy product companies in the United States

References

External links 
Maytag Dairy Farms
Little Big Cheese: Maytag's Growing Niche Market, story on NPR (January 4, 2005)

Companies based in Iowa
Jasper County, Iowa
Dairy products companies of the United States
Maytag family
Food and drink companies based in Iowa